Gwyn Roberts, an American recorder and traverso soloist, and educator, is a founding co-director of the Philadelphia baroque orchestra Tempesta di Mare with Richard Stone. Roberts also serves as the Director of Early Music at the University of Pennsylvania and is on faculty at the Peabody Conservatory of Johns Hopkins University.

Education
Gwyn Roberts earned her AB from Bryn Mawr College and her performer's certificate from Utrecht Conservatory in the Netherlands, where she studied recorder with Leo Meilink and Marion Verbruggen and baroque flute with Marten Root.

Career
Roberts has performed worldwide, with solo engagements including the Concerto Soloists Chamber Orchestra, Philomel Baroque Orchestra, Recitar Cantando (Tokyo), Prague Spring Festival (New York and Prague), Piffaro, Washington Bach Consort, and Philadelphia Classical Symphony. Her recordings include Chandos, Deutsche Grammaphon, PGM, Dorian, Sony, Vox, Polygram, Newport, Radio France. In addition to her other faculty positions, Roberts is also a popular workshop leader across the U.S. with such organizations as the Amherst Early Music Festival.

Recordings

Reception
Roberts has been called a “a world-class virtuoso” by American Record Guide.

The Washington Post remarked, “with her sparkling technique and sensitive attention to musicality, she infused the music with operatic drama.”

Her recording of Veracini Recorder Sonatas earned a five-star rating from BBC Music Magazine.

Michael Caruso has commented on "her sweet recorder playing," calling it "elegant and energetic, intimate and expansive."

References

External links
 Tempesta di Mare Biography
 Early Music America Interview

Year of birth missing (living people)
Living people
American recorder players
American classical flautists
Musicians from Philadelphia
Women flautists
Classical musicians from Pennsylvania